FlyMontserrat Flight 107 was a short-haul flight from V. C. Bird International Airport, Antigua to John A. Osborne Airport, Montserrat. On 7 October 2012, the Britten-Norman Islander twin-engine aircraft serving the route crashed shortly after take off, near the end of the runway. Three of the four occupants were killed.

Accident
At 16:15 local time FlyMontserrat Flight 107 was cleared for take off from runway 07 at V. C. Bird International Airport. Shortly after the Islander took off it started to yaw to the right and stopped climbing. The aircraft continued rolling to the right and lost height; it hit the ground and cartwheeled before coming to rest. The pilot and one passenger were killed on impact, another passenger succumbed to her injuries before she could be  extricated from the wreckage while the final passenger was seriously injured and taken to hospital.

Investigation
The Eastern Caribbean Civil Aviation Authority (ECCAA) is responsible for regulation and oversight of aviation in Antigua, where the accident occurred. Montserrat does not have its own investigators. As a British Overseas Territory this function is normally performed by the British Air Accidents Investigation Branch (AAIB), which sent a team to investigate the cause of the crash. Bad weather conditions were reported for the time prior to the accident, however conditions were reported as good at the time of takeoff.

A preliminary report by the ECCAA was released in October 2012 saying that after examining the wreckage of the aircraft, it showed that the right engine was not producing power and the propeller was not feathered. The fuel was examined and found that the fuel system showed contamination with significant quantities of water.

In July 2013, the AAIB released preliminary results of the investigation, setting out changes to prevent water contamination of Islander fuel systems; and an Airworthiness Directive was issued by the European Aviation Safety Agency (EASA) to require a check of Islanders to determine if the correct fuel filler caps had been installed. The AAIB recommended that EASA should require Britten-Norman Islander aircraft be equipped with fuel filter assemblies that minimise the likelihood of water in the fuel being fed to the engines.

See also
Dominicana Flight 603
Vieques Air Link Flight 901A
List of sole survivors of aviation accidents and incidents

References

2012 in Antigua and Barbuda
Accidents and incidents involving the Britten-Norman Islander
Aviation accidents and incidents in 2012
Aviation accidents and incidents in Antigua and Barbuda
October 2012 events in North America